Two ships in the United States Navy have been named USS Colhoun, in honor of Rear Admiral Edmund Colhoun.

Sources

United States Navy ship names